The spiny toad, spiny common toad, or giant toad (Bufo spinosus) is a species of toad native to the Iberian Peninsula, southern France, extreme northeastern Italy, and North Africa (Morocco, Algeria, and Tunisia). There is an isolated population in Jersey in the Channel Islands. For much of the 20th century, it was considered either a synonym or a subspecies of common toad Bufo bufo, but it is now classified as a separate species.

Diet
These toads feed on a number of invertebrates from earthworms to insects and woodlice.

Description
Adult males measure  and adult females  in snout–vent length.

References

Bufo
Frogs of Africa
Amphibians of North Africa
Amphibians of Europe
Taxa named by François Marie Daudin
Amphibians described in 1803